Afrotysonia is a genus of flowering plants belonging to the family Boraginaceae.

Its native range is Eastern Tropical and Southern Africa.

Species:

Afrotysonia africana 
Afrotysonia glochidiata 
Afrotysonia pilosicaulis

References

Boraginaceae
Boraginaceae genera